Verticordia auriculata is a flowering plant in the myrtle family, Myrtaceae and is endemic to the south-west of Western Australia. It is a small, multi-branched shrub with small leaves and spikes of pink to magenta-coloured flowers in late spring to early summer and it is widespread in the wheatbelt.

Description

Flowering time is from October to January.

Taxonomy and naming
Verticordia auriculata was first formally described by Alex George in 1991 and the description was published in Nuytsia from specimens collected near Perenjori. The specific epithet (auriculata) is derived from a Latin word meaning "having ear-like appendages" referring to the appendages on the sepals.

George placed this species in subgenus Eperephes, section Verticordella along with V. pennigera, V. halophila, V. blepharophylla, V. lindleyi, V. carinata, V. drummondii, V. wonganensis,V. paludosa, V. luteola, V. attenuata, V. tumida, V. mitodes, V. centipeda, V. bifimbriata, V. pholidophylla, V. spicata and V. hughanii.

Distribution and habitat
This verticordia grows in sand, often over other substrates, often in association with other verticordias, in heath or shrubland. It is widespread in areas between Mullewa, Yalgoo, Moonijin and Mukinbudin in the Avon Wheatbelt, Geraldton Sandplains and Yalgoo biogeographic regions.

Conservation
Verticordia auriculata is classified as "not threatened" by the Western Australian Government Department of Parks and Wildlife.

Use in horticulture
In cultivation V. auriculata is usually a compact shrub with scented flowers, making it an attractive garden plant, but it has proven difficult to establish. It seems to prefer sand with some gravel added but will not tolerate phosphorus-containing fertiliser. Further experiments need to be undertaken to establish its requirements for horticulture. It has been propagated from seed and from cuttings but fungal diseases can cause problems for young plants.

References

auriculata
Rosids of Western Australia
Eudicots of Western Australia
Plants described in 1991